András Mészáros (born 29 March 1996) is a Slovak footballer who plays as a forward for KFC Komárno in the 2. Liga. He is an ethnic Hungarian.

Club career

DAC Dunajská Streda
He made his professional Fortuna Liga debut for DAC Dunajská Streda against Slovan Bratislava on 24 October 2015.

References

External links
 FC DAC 1904 Dunajská Streda profile
 
 Eurofotbal profile
 Futbalnet profile
 

1996 births
Living people
Hungarians in Slovakia
Sportspeople from Komárno
Slovak footballers
Slovak expatriate footballers
Association football forwards
FC DAC 1904 Dunajská Streda players
KFC Komárno players
FK Pohronie players
FC ViOn Zlaté Moravce players
ŠKF Sereď players
FK Csíkszereda Miercurea Ciuc players
Slovak Super Liga players
2. Liga (Slovakia) players
Liga II players
Slovak expatriate sportspeople in Romania
Expatriate footballers in Romania